Kailzie Gardens is a walled garden near Kirkburn in the Scottish Borders area of Scotland, in the Tweed valley, four km east of Peebles, off the B7062.

The garden dates from 1812. The present owners are Steve and Susan Plag.

Places in the vicinity include Cardrona, the Cardrona Forest, Horsburgh Castle and the Glentress Forest.

See also
List of places in the Scottish Borders
List of places in Scotland

References

 (Payment required.)

External links
CANMORE/RCAHMS record for Kailzie House,Kailsie, Kailzie Gardens
RCAHMS: Kailzie House
Garden
Gazetteer for Scotland: Kailzie Gardens
Border Forest Trust: The Kailzie Larch
VisitScotland site about Kailzie Gardens
Scotland's Gardens Scheme, gardens open for charity: Kailzie
Kailzie Gardens official website
Ospreys
Forestry Commission Scotland: Ospreys in the Tweed Valley
Scottish Government: Osprey Viewing Centres

Gardens in the Scottish Borders